John Phillips Marquand (November 10, 1893 – July 16, 1960) was an American writer. Originally best known for his Mr. Moto spy stories, he achieved popular success and critical respect for his satirical novels, winning a Pulitzer Prize for The Late George Apley in 1938. One of his abiding themes was the confining nature of life in America's upper class and among those who aspired to join it. Marquand treated those whose lives were bound by these unwritten codes with a characteristic mix of respect and satire.

Ancestry, youth and early adulthood
Marquand was the son of Philip Marquand and his wife Margaret née Fuller.  His mother was a great-niece of 19th-century transcendentalist and feminist Margaret Fuller. Marquand was also a cousin of Buckminster Fuller. Born in Wilmington, Delaware, he grew up in Newburyport, Massachusetts, where his forebears had lived. There he was raised by his three maiden aunts, while his parents lived in a number of other cities as his father pursued his career.

Marquand attended Newburyport High School where he won a scholarship that enabled him to attend Harvard College. His family had a long Harvard tradition, but as an impecunious public school graduate in the heyday of Harvard's Gold Coast, he was an unclubbable outsider. Though turned down by the college newspaper, the Harvard Crimson, Marquand succeeded in being elected to the editorial board of the humor magazine, the Harvard Lampoon.  After graduating in 1915, Marquand was hired by The Boston Evening Transcript, working initially as a reporter and later on the Transcript's bi-weekly magazine section.

While he was a student at Harvard, Marquand joined Battery A of the Massachusetts National Guard, which, in 1916, was activated. In July 1916, Marquand was sent to the Mexican border. Later, like many of his classmates, he served in the First World War, seeing action in France.

Life and work

Marquand's life and work reflected his ambivalence about American society — and, in particular, the power of its old-line elites. Being rebuffed by fashionable Harvard did not discourage his social aspirations. In 1922, he married Christina Sedgwick, niece of The Atlantic Monthly editor Ellery Sedgwick. In 1925, Marquand published his first important book, Lord Timothy Dexter, an exploration of the life and legend of eighteenth-century Newburyport eccentric Timothy Dexter (1763–1806).

By the mid-1930s he was a prolific and successful writer of fiction for slick magazines like the Saturday Evening Post. Some of these short stories were of an historical nature as had been Marquand's first two novels (The Unspeakable Gentleman and  The Black Cargo). These would later be characterized by Marquand as “costume fiction”, of which he stated that an author “can only approximate (his characters) provided he has been steeped in the (relevant) tradition”. Marquand had abandoned “costume fiction” by the mid-1930s.

In the late 1930s, Marquand began producing a series of novels on the dilemmas of class. Most centered on New England, and some were at least partially set in Clyde, Massachusetts, a fictional seaside community based strongly on Marquand's Newburyport. The first of these novels, The Late George Apley (1937), a satire of Boston's upper class, won the Pulitzer Prize for the Novel in 1938. Other Marquand novels exploring New England and class themes include Wickford Point (1939), H.M. Pulham, Esquire (1941), and Point of No Return (1949). The last is especially notable for its satirical portrayal of Harvard anthropologist W. Lloyd Warner, whose Yankee City study attempted (and in Marquand's view, dismally failed) to describe and analyze the manners and mores of Newburyport.

Marquand was a part-time war correspondent during World War II. The war's huge effect on American individuals and families is often an element in his later novels. Several characters in these novels are motivated by a sense of duty to aid the war effort, though they are past draft age and even unsure of the value of their contribution.

For all of his ambivalence about America's elite, Marquand ultimately succeeded not only in joining it, but in embodying its characteristics. He forgave the upper crust classmates who had snubbed him in college (relationships he satirized in H.M. Pulham, Esq and The Late George Apley). He was invited to join all the right social clubs in Boston (Tavern, Somerset) and New York (Century Association, University). Through his second marriage to Adelaide Ferry Hooker, he became linked to the Rockefeller family (her sister, Blanchette, was married to John D. Rockefeller III). He maintained luxury homes in Newburyport and in the Caribbean.

Personal life
Marquand was married twice and had five children. He married Christina Sedgwick in 1922, and they had two children: son John Jr and a daughter Christina Jr. Marquand and Sedgwick divorced in 1935. The following year, Marquand married Adelaide Ferry Hooker, a descendant of Thomas Hooker. They had three children together, two sons and a daughter, before divorcing in 1958.

Death
On July 16, 1960, Marquand died in Newburyport, Massachusetts, of a heart attack in his sleep at the age of 66. He is buried in Sawyer Hill Burying Ground in Newburyport.

Novels
Mr Moto novels

No Hero. Boston, Little Brown, 1935; as Mr. Moto Takes a Hand, London, Hale, 1940; as Your Turn, Mr. Moto, New York, Berkley, 1963.
Thank You, Mr. Moto. Boston, Little Brown, 1936; London, Jenkins, 1937.
Think Fast, Mr. Moto. Boston, Little Brown, 1937; London, Hale, 1938.
Mr. Moto Is So Sorry. Boston, Little Brown, 1938; London, Hale, 1939.
Last Laugh, Mr. Moto. Boston, Little Brown, 1942; London, Hale, 1943.
Stopover Tokyo. Boston, Little Brown, and London, Collins, 1957; as The Last of Mr. Moto, New York, Berkley, 1963; as Right You Are, Mr. Moto, New York, Popular Library, 1977.

Other crime novels

Ming Yellow. Boston, Little Brown, and London, Lovat Dickson, 1935.
Don't Ask Questions. London, Hale, 1941.
It's Loaded, Mr. Bauer. London, Hale, 1949.

Literary novels

The Unspeakable Gentleman. New York, Scribner, and London, Hodder and Stoughton, 1922.
The Black Cargo. New York, Scribner, and London, Hodder and Stoughton, 1925.
Warning Hill. Boston, Little Brown, 1930.
The Late George Apley. Boston, Little Brown, 1937.
Wickford Point. Boston, Little Brown, 1939.
H.M. Pulham, Esquire. Boston, Little Brown, and London, Hale, 1942.
So Little Time. Boston, Little Brown, 1943; London, Hale, 1944.
Repent in Haste. Boston, Little Brown, 1945.
B.F.'s Daughter. Boston, Little Brown, 1946; as Polly Fulton, London, Hale, 1947.
Point of No Return. Boston, Little Brown, and London, Hale, 1949.
Melville Goodwin, USA. Boston, Little Brown, 1951; London, Hale, 1952.
Sincerely, Willis Wayde. Boston, Little Brown, and London, Hale, 1955.
Women and Thomas Harrow. Boston, Little Brown, 1958; London, Collins, 1959.

The Late George Apley, Wickford Point, H.M. Pulham, Esquire, So Little Time, Repent in Haste, and B.F.'s Daughter were published as Armed Services Editions during WWII.

Collections of short stories

Four of a Kind, 1923.
Haven's End. Boston, Little Brown, 1933; London, Hale, 1938.
Thirty Years, 1954.
Life at Happy Knoll, 1957.

Notes

References
Stephen Birmingham, The Late John Marquand: A Biography, J. B. Lippincott Company 1972.
Millicent Bell, Marquand: An American Life, Little, Brown and Company, 1979.

External links
 
 
 
The Mr. Moto novels of John P. Marquand, website by James S. Koga.
John Marquand Society of North America
Extensive biography on Marquand
Photos of the first edition of The Late George Apley
 Yale University Library, Beinecke Rare Book and Manuscript Library, Yale Collection of American Literature, Copyright  1996-2007 by the Yale University Library.  Guide to the John P. Marquand Collection, YCAL MSS 48, by T. Michael Womack, May 1990, Revised: 2010-02-10

1893 births
1960 deaths
20th-century American male writers
20th-century American novelists
American male novelists
American male short story writers
United States Army personnel of World War I
American satirical novelists
American spy fiction writers
American Unitarians
Burials in Massachusetts
The Harvard Lampoon alumni
Harvard College alumni
National Guard (United States) officers
Pulitzer Prize for the Novel winners
Writers from Newburyport, Massachusetts
Writers from Wilmington, Delaware
Novelists from Massachusetts
Massachusetts National Guard personnel